The Mohajer-6 is an Iranian single-engine multirole ISTAR UAV capable of carrying a multispectral surveillance payload and/or up to four precision-guided munitions.

The Mohajer-6 was unveiled in April 2016 and entered mass production in February 2018. As of February 2018, ten have been manufactured for the IRGC Ground Forces, and 40 are planned for the IRGC Navy. It complements the larger Shahed 129 operated by the IRGC Aerospace Force. The drone has also been delivered to the Iranian Army.

Design
The Mohajer-6 has a rectangular fuselage, an upwards-sloping nose, twin tailbooms, a top-mounted horizontal stabilizer, uncanted wingtips, straight wings mounted high and to the rear of the body, and air intakes on the top and bottom of the engine. The Mohajer-6 is controlled by two elevators on the horizontal stabilizer, rudders on the vertical stabilizers, and two flaps per wing. Unlike other Mohajer variants, it has a three-bladed propeller. According to a spec sheet provided by the Iran Ministry of Defense, the Mohajer-6 has a wingspan of 10 meters and is 5.67 meters long. It is similar in shape to the Selex ES Falco.

As with other members of the Mohajer family, the Mohajer-6 is made of composite.The Mohajer-6 has fixed tricycle landing gear, which underwent changes between the unveiling ceremony in 2017 and mass production in 2018, perhaps to accommodate more weight. It is launched and recovered via runway takeoff/landing.

It has a fixed, forward facing camera for navigation and a gimbal on the chin for a laser range finder and multispectral IR and visible light electro-optical imagery. The Mohajer-6 has three antennas, two on its left wing and one on its right, and a pitot tube on its nose. The Mohajer-6 has two main variants. The A variant has two hardpoints, one under each wing, of which can each carry one Qaem TV/IR-guided missile or one Almas missile. The B variant has 4 hardpoints, with 2 under each wing carrying the same types of missiles. It has an autopilot system capable of automatic takeoff and landing. In addition, Iran describes it as capable of being fitted with electronic support measures, communications jamming, or electronic warfare payloads.

Performance
The Mohajer-6 has a max takeoff weight of 600–670 kg and can carry about 100–150 kg armaments, depending on model. Also the ground control station of Mohajer-6 has 200–500 km range. It has a max speed of 200 km/h, an endurance of 12 hours, and a ceiling of 16,000-18,000 feet.

Multiple sources say that although the Mohajer-6 is designed by Qods Aviation, it is manufactured by Qods' longtime rival, Iran Aircraft Manufacturing Industrial Company (HESA). Both Qods and HESA are subsidiaries of Iran's state-owned Aerospace Industries Organization.

Specifications 
Specifications of Mohajer-6 from Qods Aviations and Iran Aircraft Manufacturing Industries (HESA):

Although the manufacturing company did not officially release the specifications and announcements for mohajer-6, according to the information published by Iran's domestic news agencies, the specifications for two models are reported in June 2017 and August 2022 as follows.

General characteristics
 Crew: 2 per ground control station
 Length: 7.5 m (24 ft 7 in) 
 Wing span: 10 m (32 ft 10 in)
 Max. take-off mass: 600/670 kg (1,323/1,477 lb)
 Payload: 100/150 kg (220/330 lb)
 Powerplant: 1 × 115 hp Water-cooled 4-stroke internal combustion engine, either Austrian Rotax 914 or indigenous engine from HESA)
 Propeller: 3-bladed
 Fuel type: gasoline (petrol)

Performance
 Maximum speed: 200 km/h (110 knots)
 Cruise speed: 130 km/h (70 knots)
 Radius of action:  2,000/2400 km (1,080/1,300 nmi)
 Ground Communication range:  200-500 kilometres (130/312 mi)
 Service ceiling: 25,000 ft (7,600 m)
 Operational altitude: 16,000/18,000 ft (4,876/5,486 m)
 Endurance: 12 hours

Armaments
4 slots for guided missiles or bombs under the wings and 2 slots under the main fuselage.

The armament mounting and launching system of Mohajer-6 is similar to many other UAV models operating within the Iranian armed forces and many types of air-to-ground, air to air missiles, guided rockets, guided mortars, electronic countermeasure and radar detection and warning pods can be used with Mohajer-6 ammunition launching system.

Operational history
The Mohajer-6 has reportedly been used against the salafist-jihadist terrorist group Jaish ul-Adl that is active in Iran's southern regions. Some Mohajer-6s seem to be based at Qeshm Island.

In July 2019, Iran used the Mohajer-6 against PJAK militants.

In September 2022, Russia used a Mohajer-6 to guide Geran-2 suicide drones to their targets in Ukraine during their Invasion of Ukraine.

Operators 

 : Reported to be used by Ethiopia.
 :
 Islamic Republic of Iran Army
 Islamic Revolutionary Guard Corps Ground Forces
 Islamic Revolutionary Guard Corps Navy: 15 known to be in service.
 Islamic Republic of Iran Army Ground Forces
 :
 Popular Mobilization Forces
 : Bought and used by Russia during the 2022 Russian invasion of Ukraine. This has been indirectly confirmed on 23 September 2022, when a Mohajer-6 crashed in the Black Sea near the coast of Odesa.
 : It was reported in November 2020 that technology transfer was likely done. A Venezuelan Mohajer-6 was reported to be seen in Caracas in the same month. President Nicolás Maduro claimed that the country can one day export Venezuelan-made drones.

References

Notes

External links 

 

Mohajer
Twin-boom aircraft
Single-engined pusher aircraft
Unmanned military aircraft of Iran
Iranian military aircraft
Aircraft manufactured in Iran
Islamic Republic of Iran Air Force
Post–Cold War military equipment of Iran

Unmanned aerial vehicles of Iran